"Debate de 4" (English: "Debate of 4") is a song by American singer Romeo Santos, featuring Dominican bachata singers Luis Vargas, Raulín Rodríguez and Anthony Santos, from his first studio album Formula, Vol. 1 (2011).

Chart performance

Certifications

References 

2011 songs
Romeo Santos songs
Songs written by Romeo Santos
Spanish-language songs